Tang Siu Hau is a Hong Kong female singer who had released 3 extended plays throughout her career.

Extended plays

Charted singles

As a featuring artist

Non-album singles

Other appearance

References 

Tang, Siu Hau
Pop music discographies